Subburayulu Munuswami Subbaiah Naidu (a.k.a. SMS) (15 March 1914 – 26 May 1979) was an Indian composer, conductor, and orchestrator. He was one of the oldest music directors. He worked as an in-house music composer for Central Studios and Pakshiraja Studios and well associated with S. M. Sriramulu Naidu. SMS also worked with many films under Jupiter Pictures banner and a favorite of M. G. Ramachandran.

Early life
Born in 1914 in Kadaiyanallur, Subburayalu Munusami Subbiah Naidu had an unhappy childhood. He ran away from home with dreams of finding his fortune in Singapore, but ended up working in drama troupes such as those of Jagannatha Aiyer and Nawab Rajamanickam Pillai. Finding himself drawn more to music than acting, SMS learned music from masters such as Rajagopala Iyengar and Subramaniya Bagavathar. When the company's play Baktha Ramadas was made into a movie, SMS worked on the music for the movie as well.

Career life
He is fondly known as "Sangeethayya" in the south Indian film industries. He somehow had never changed his trend of composing much from the beginning days. He is well versed in the Indian music but never showed interest in Western tunes and music.

SMS worked jointly with other composers on a few movies in the early 1940s. He then composed music for the first movie in which MGR played the hero Rajakumaari in 1947. All through the 1950s, SMS continued to compose memorable songs in the movies that came his way. Films such as Ezhai Padum Padu (1950), Kanchana (1952) and Malaikkallan (1954) helped him to consolidate his place among the front-ranking composers of the decade. There were also Thirumanam, Maragadham, Nadodi Mannan and the magnificent classic Konjum Salangai.

While he was composing music for Rajakumaari at Central Studious, SMS made the acquaintance of the hero MGR. This laid the basis for a lifelong friendship between the two, which was further strengthened during the making of Marma Yogi and Malaikkallan. When MGR turned producer and director with Nadodi Mannan, he invited SMS to compose the songs, along with N.S. Balakrishnan who had composed 2 songs. Later, when the fortunes of SMS were on the decline in the 1960s, MGR secured for his friend a few opportunities such as Thaayin Madiyil, Aasai Mugam and Thalaivan.

As the 1960s progressed, SMS engaged in a few projects towards the end of the 1960s such as Naam Moovar, Raja Veetu Pillai, Uyir Mel Aasai, Sabash Thambi, Panakkara Pillai, Naalum Therindhavan, Chakkaram and Mannippu.

In the 1970s, opportunities were few and far between Snegithi, Vairakiyam, Therottam and Thanga Gopuram.

His contribution is invaluable. Not only he is a composer, but also very good conductor, orchestrator, and what not. He is considered as O. P. Nayyar of South India. His tunes were very catchy and his songs instant hits. He has made J. P. Chandrababu a great singer in the song Kunguma Poove Konjum Puraave. He would leave no stone unturned to bring the best of his singers. Till date, the best of S. Janaki is Singaara Velane Deva which was composed by him. He innovated the concept of voice with Nadaswaram.

He worked with singers like C. S. Jayaraman, T. M. Soundararajan, Ghantalasa, A. M. Rajah, Thiruchi Loganathan, Seerkazhi Govindarajan, V. N. Sundharam, T. A. Mothi, P. B. Sreenivas, S. C. Krishnan, A. L. Raghavan, M. L. Vasanthakumari, P. A. Periyanayaki, P. Leela, Jikki, P. Susheela, T. V. Rathnam, K. V. Janaki, A. P. Komala, K. Jamuna Rani, Radha Jayalakshmi, Soolamangalam Rajalakshmi, S. Janaki and L. R. Eswari.

The singing actors P. U. Chinnappa, C. Honnappa Bhagavathar, N. C. Vasanthakokilam, U. R. Jeevarathinam, T. R. Rajakumari, K. R. Ramasamy, V. Nagayya, N. S. Krishnan, T. A. Madhuram, P. Bhanumathi, S. Varalakshmi and J. P. Chandrababu also sang memorable songs under his compositions.

Trivia
In 1947, SMS was the first music composer in Tamil film industry who had introduced playback singing for Rajakumari. Thiruchi Loganathan sang "Kasinimel Nangal", a playback song for M. N. Nambiar. It is notable that it is MGR's first movie as a hero.
In 1948 under SMS's composition, Kannadasan wrote his first song "Kalangathiru Manamey Un Kanavellan Nanavagum Oru Dinamey" for Kanniyin Kathali sung by K. V. Janaki. The film was released in 1949.
 His all-purpose assistant, M. S. Viswanathan at Jupiter Pictures later became the musician of Tamil films. As his assistant, M. S. Viswanathan practised composing tunes when SMS was not around. When MGR was the Chief Minister of Tamil Nadu, M. S. Viswanathan had organised a programme to honour his "master" SMS. SMS was a very close friend of MGR.
He featured in a role as a doctor in Malaikkallan that won the National Film Award for Best Feature Film in Tamil.
 He had composed a few songs for Thirudadhe and was working on setting the tune for a duet when producer AL. Srinivasan made him listen to a song En Aruge Nee Irundhaal sung by P. B. Sreenivas & P. Susheela. The song had been composed by Viswanathan–Ramamoorthy for an earlier project and had remained unused. AL. Srinivasan suggested that the song be included in the movie. Seeing that it was by his protégé M. S. Viswanathan, SMS readily agreed, and thus the song featured with the credit once again going to SMS.
 M. S. Viswanathan and Kannadasan, who have acknowledged many a time the crucial role played by SMS in shaping their career, organized a grand function to celebrate the 60th birthday of the master composer. In the function graced by MGR and Sivaji Ganesan, a cash award was presented to SMS as a token of his contribution to Tamil cinema.
 M. S. Viswanathan brought the childless SMS and his wife to his house and attended to their every need with solicitude until each of their end.

Works
Some compositions of S. M. Subbaiah Naidu, include
 Thirudaathe Paappaa from Thirudadhe by T. M. Soundararajan
 Yauvanamae Aahaa Yauvanamae by M. L. Vasanthakumari from Ezhai Padum Padu
 O Kiliye Aasai Kiliye by P. A. Periyanayaki from Ezhai Padum Padu
 Ethanai Kaalanthaan from Malaikkallan by T. M. Soundararajan
 Thoongaathe Thambi from Nadodi Mannan by T. M. Soundararajan
 Singaara Velane Deva from Konjum Salangai by S. Janaki
 Nee Engey En Ninaivugalangey from Mannippu by T. M. Soundararajan
 Kuyilosayai Vellum form Mannippu by P. Suseela & A. P. Komala
 Maalai Mayangukindra Neram from Maragadham by Radha Jayalakshmi
 Kannukkulle Unnai Paaru from Maragadham by T. M. Soundararajan & Radha Jayalakshmi
 Annaiyai Pol Oru Dheivamillai from Annaiyin Aanai by T. M. Soundararajan
 Kanavin Maya Logathile from Annaiyin Aanai by T. M. Soundararajan & P. Suseela
 Ethanai Selvangal Vandhaalume from Thaayin Madiyil by T. M. Soundararajan
 Sabash Thambi Un kolgaiyai Potrukiren from Sabash Thambi by T. M. Soundararajan
 Kannil Vanthu Minnal Pol from Nadodi Mannan by T. M. Soundararajan & Jikki
 Ina Mina Dika from Athisaya Penn by P. Suseela
 Neeya Illai Naana from Aasai Mugam by T. M. Soundararajan & P. Suseela

Filmography

References

External links

 Kammas World: S M Subbaiah Naidu: First Kamma Music Director
Myriad Music Composers of the Last Century in My Movie Minutes

1914 births
1979 deaths
Tamil musicians
20th-century Indian musicians
Tamil film score composers